Carlos Roberto Lupi (born 16 March 1957) is a Brazilian professor and politician. He is the president of the Democratic Labour Party (PDT) and one of the vice presidents of the Socialist International (SI).

During Luiz Inácio Lula da Silva (PT) and Dilma Rousseff's (PT) government, he was the Minister of Labour and Employment between March 2007 and December 2011.

Lupi was also State Secretary of Government of Rio de Janeiro, State Secretary of Transports of Rio de Janeiro and Federal Deputy for the same state.

References 

1957 births
Living people
People from Campinas
Government ministers of Brazil
Members of the Chamber of Deputies (Brazil) from Rio de Janeiro (state)
Democratic Labour Party (Brazil) politicians